Birkan is a Turkish masculine given name and surname. Notable people with the name include:

 Birkan Kirdar, Australian association football player
 Birkan Batuk, Turkish basketball player
 Melis Birkan, Turkish actress
 Birkan Sokullu, Turkish actor

Turkish-language surnames
Turkish masculine given names